Corps  colours, or Troop-function colours, (German: "Waffenfarbe(n)") were worn by the National People's Army of the German Democratic Republic from 1956 to 1990.

Introduction 
The GDR NPA uniforms initially bore the corps colours as worn by the Wehrmacht, i.e. as base and filling of the collar and sleeve patches, and as a piping around the shoulder boards/shoulder straps.

Between 1974 and 1979, alongside the introduction of uniforms with open collar and tie, patches of the NPA Landstreitkräfte uniforms were unified across all corps, with a  base and a white filling, along with white collar piping; the piping of the shoulder boards/shoulder straps remained the only part carrying Waffenfarbe.

However, Air Forces of the National People's Army, paratroopers and generals as well as the Volksmarine continued to wear their specially designed and coloured patches.

The uniform of the Border Troops was distinguished from that of the NVA ground force and Air Force/Air Defence Force by a green armband with large silver letters identifying the wearer's affiliation, and a green cap band.

The tables below contain the corps colours used by the NPA since 1986.)

Land Forces of the National People's Army 
⇒ see main article Ranks of the National People's Army

Air Forces of the National People's Army

Border Troops of the German Democratic Republic

Volksmarine

Civil defense of the GDR 
Civil defense of the GDR
 Common (generals, as well): Malino (:de:Himbeerrot, meaning the same as and similar in shade to English raspberry)

Other users 
Waffenfarben were also worn by the troops of the Stasi, "Ministry for State Security", the Ministry of Internal Affairs with several branches of the police, fire brigades, etc.

See also 
 Waffenfarbe
 Glossary of German military terms

References 

German military uniforms
National People's Army